Hans Otto may refer to:
 Hans Otto Löwenstein (1881–1931), Austrian film director and screenwriter
 Hans Otto (actor) (1900–1933), German stage actor
 Hans Otto (organist) (1922–1996), German organist, harpsichordist and cantor

See also